The Flaming Teen-Age is a 1956 film directed by Irvin Yeaworth. It stars Noel Reyburn and Ethel Barrett.

See also
List of American films of 1956

References

External links

1956 films
1956 drama films
1950s English-language films
American drama films
Films directed by Irvin Yeaworth
1950s American films
American black-and-white films